Oenocarpus makeru is a species of flowering plant in the family Arecaceae. It is found only in Colombia.

References

makeru
Data deficient plants
Endemic flora of Colombia
Taxonomy articles created by Polbot